Bill Miller (1931 – February 20, 2006) was an American football coach and college athletics administrator.  He served as the head football coach at Southwest Texas State University now—Texas State University—from 1965 to 1978, compiling a record of 86–51–3.  Miller was also the athletic director at Southwest Texas State from 1972 to 1992.

Biography
Miller was born in Goldthwaite, Texas in 1931 and graduated from Goldthwaite High School there in 1949. He served in the United States Navy during the Korean War before enrolling Southwest Texas State University now—Texas State University. Miller played for the Southwest Texas State Bobcats as a fullback and halfback in 1955 and 1956.

Miller coached high school football at Alice High School in Alice, Texas and Roy Miller High School in Corpus Christi, Texas before returning to Southwest Texas State as an assistant coach in 1961.  He  succeeded Milton Jowers as head football coach in 1965.  Miller was head football coach for 14 seasons, the second longest tenure in program history and has the most wins with 86.  Miller retired as athletics director at Texas State in 1992.

Head coaching record

References

1931 births
2006 deaths
American football fullbacks
American football halfbacks
Texas State Bobcats athletic directors
Texas State Bobcats football coaches
Texas State Bobcats football players
High school football coaches in Texas
United States Navy personnel of the Korean War
People from Goldthwaite, Texas